is a Japanese footballer who plays for Nara Club.

Club statistics
Updated to 23 February 2017.

References

External links

Profile at YSCC Yokohama

1991 births
Living people
Kanto Gakuin University alumni
Association football people from Kanagawa Prefecture
Japanese footballers
J3 League players
Japan Football League players
YSCC Yokohama players
Nara Club players
Association football goalkeepers